Cedros, Portuguese and Spanish for cedars, may refer to the following places:

Honduras
Cedros, Francisco Morazán, a municipality in the Department of Francisco Morazán

Mexico
Cedros Island, an island in the State of Baja California

Portugal
Cedros (Horta), a civil parish in the municipality of Horta, island of Faial, Azores
Cedros (Santa Cruz das Flores), a civil parish in the municipality of Santa Cruz das Flores, island of Flores, Azores

Trinidad and Tobago
Cedros, Trinidad and Tobago, the southwestern peninsula of the island of Trinidad, as well as a town on that peninsula

Cuba
Los Cedros, Santiago de Cuba, a hamlet in Palma Soriano